Zhuang Xiaotian (Traditional Chinese: 莊曉天, Simplified Chinese: 庄晓天), is a Chinese politician and senior banker. He is the first President of the Shanghai Pudong Development Bank.

Biography
Zhuang was born in 1933 in Zhenhai County (current Beilun District), Ningbo, Zhejiang Province. 1945, he graduated from Weidou Elementary School. He went to Shanghai with his brother. He is a graduate of Shanghai University of Finance and Economics.

Zhuang is the former vice mayor of Shanghai. He was mainly in charge of Shanghai's commerce, trade and industry. He's the current President of the Foundation for Shanghai Elderly, the President of the Shanghai Urban Development Foundation, the Chief Supervisor for the Shanghai Charity Foundation, the President of Shanghai-Ningbo Economic Association (上海宁波经贸促进会), and the President of the Shanghai-Ningbo Chamber of Commerce (上海宁波商会).

References

1933 births
Chinese bankers
Regional leaders in the People's Republic of China
Living people
Businesspeople from Ningbo
People's Republic of China politicians from Zhejiang
Political office-holders in Shanghai
Politicians from Ningbo